Ware Weir is a large weir on the River Lea in Ware, Hertfordshire, England.

References

External links 
 Ware Weir - a history

Weirs in Hertfordshire
Weirs on the River Lea
Buildings and structures in Ware, Hertfordshire